Ian Williams (born 26 April 1977) is a world class sailor with many credits to his name, including seven time winner of the World Match Racing Championships.

Williams specialises in match racing competing in the World Match Racing Tour. In 2008 following winning the tour and therefore the World Championship title he was shortlisted by the International Sailing Federation for the ISAF World Sailor of the Year Awards. This achievement was remarkable as Williams was up against a number of full-time professional America's Cup teams.

Williams is featured on the International mainstream sports talk broadcast network as a sailing celebrity on Sports Byline on Sail Sport Talk with Karen Lile (co-host Rick Tittle)

References

External links
 
 

1977 births
Living people
Sportspeople from Exeter
English male sailors (sport)
China Team sailors
Extreme Sailing Series sailors